Zhuzilin station is a station of Shenzhen Metro Line 1. It opened on 28 December 2004. It is located at the underground of the junction of Guangshen Expressway and west of Shennan Road in Futian District, Shenzhen, China. Besides two rail tracks for Line 1, there is an extra track to a depot called "Zhuzilin Depot" for operations control centre and maintenance workshop.

Station layout

Exits

See also 
Zhuzilin Depot

References

External links
 Shenzhen Metro Zhuzilin Station (Chinese)
 Shenzhen Metro Zhuzilin Station (English)

Railway stations in Guangdong
Shenzhen Metro stations
Futian District
Railway stations in China opened in 2004
Railway stations located underground in China